Medingen is a village in the commune of Contern, in southern Luxembourg.  , the village has a population of 102 but has since increased to 125.

Republic 
A sign "Place de la République" hangs in the courtyard of the old school.

Its origins go back to a carnival . In the early 1980s, music from the village was held for the carnival cape sessions, during which sketches were performed, in which, among other things, the village politicians were scolded. Aloyse Leytem wrote a sketch in which a republic was to be proclaimed in Medingen, and a republic sign was hung in the schoolyard.

The sign still hangs today.

Geography 
Medingen is located on a hill on a road between Moutfort and Dalheim. South of it is a large forest filled with various hiking, cycling and horse riding trails. To the west of Medingen are 2 small peak, one of which is named Zennebierg. To the west of that is a few small forests and a small trail which runs to Brichermillen.

References 

Contern
Villages in Luxembourg